Max James Watters (born 23 March 1999) is an English professional footballer who plays as a striker for Barnsley on loan from Championship club Cardiff City.

Watters started his career playing non-league football with Thurrock, Barking and Ashford United before signing with League One side Doncaster Rovers in summer 2018. Following loan spells at Grantham Town, Gainsborough Trinity, Mickleover Sports and Maidstone United, he was released by Doncaster Rovers at the end of the 2019–20 season. He signed for League Two club Crawley Town in October 2020, moving to Championship club Cardiff City in January 2021.

Early and personal life
Born in Camden, Watters attended Hall Mead School and Shenfield High School.

Club career

Early career
Watters began his career in non-league football with Thurrock, Barking and Ashford United. He never made a first-team appearance for Thurrock. With Barking, he scored 3 goals in 11 league games, and 3 goals in 4 cup games. With Ashford, he scored 8 goals in 25 league games; he also made a further 2 cup appearances, without scoring.

Doncaster Rovers
In May 2018 it was announced that Watters would turn professional with Doncaster Rovers for the 2018–19 season, joining the club on a two-year contract for an undisclosed fee. He moved on loan to Grantham Town in August 2018. He scored 4 goals in 21 games in all competitions for Grantham Town. He then joined Northern Premier League club Gainsborough Trinity on 18 January 2019 on a month-long loan. He scored on his debut for the club the following day with the only goal of a 1–0 win over Mickleover Sports.

In September 2019 he moved on loan to Mickleover Sports. He made his senior debut for Doncaster on 29 October 2019 in the EFL Trophy, before making his league debut on 7 December 2019 as a substitute in a 1–1 draw with Milton Keynes Dons. On 21 February 2020, he moved to Maidstone United on a month-long loan. He made his league debut for the club the following day, starting in a 2–1 defeat at home to Hampton & Richmond Borough. He failed to score in four league appearances whilst at Maidstone United. He was released by Doncaster at the end of the 2019–20 season, having made 5 league appearances whilst at the club.

Crawley Town
After being released by Doncaster Rovers, Watters had trial spells with Maidstone United, Bromley and Dagenham & Redbridge before joining League Two club Crawley Town on trial after playing against them in a friendly for Maidstone United in September 2020. On 10 October 2020, he signed for Crawley Town on a one-year contract with the option of a further year. He scored on his Crawley debut on 13 October 2020 in an EFL Trophy tie against Arsenal U21s. He then scored twice on his league debut in a 4–0 victory over Morecambe four days later. After scoring 5 goals in 5 League Two games for Crawley in October 2020, he was nominated for the EFL League Two Player of the Month award for October, though it was awarded to Cambridge United striker Paul Mullin. Crawley's signing of Watters was praised by former footballer Stephen Warnock (appearing on the EFL on Quest TV show) as a "terrific piece of recruitment". Having scored 6 league goals in December 2020, including a brace as a substitute against Mansfield Town and a hat-trick against Barrow, he was awarded the League Two Player of the Month award for December.

Cardiff City
He signed for Cardiff City on 16 January 2021 on a three-and-a-half-year contract for an undisclosed fee. Crawley Town manager John Yems later suggested the fee was £1 million.

On 8 July 2021, Watters joined League One side Milton Keynes Dons on loan for the duration of the 2021–22 season. After missing the start of the season through injury, he scored his first goal for the club on 18 September 2021 in a 4–1 away win over Gillingham. On 30 December 2021, Cardiff City activated a clause to return Watters from his loan early, having scored 7 goals in 14 appearances in all competitions for MK Dons.

Following his return, on 22 January 2022 Watters scored his first goal for Cardiff in his first game back for the club in a 3–2 defeat away to Bristol City.

On 5 January 2023, Watters returned to League One to join Barnsley on loan until the end of the 2022–23 season.

International career
Watters has represented England Schoolboys.

Career statistics

Honours
Individual
 EFL League Two Player of the Month: December 2020

References

External links

 Max Watters at cardiffcityfc.co.uk

1999 births
Living people
English footballers
Thurrock F.C. players
Barking F.C. players
Ashford United F.C. players
Doncaster Rovers F.C. players
Grantham Town F.C. players
Mickleover Sports F.C. players
Gainsborough Trinity F.C. players
Maidstone United F.C. players
Crawley Town F.C. players
Cardiff City F.C. players
Milton Keynes Dons F.C. players
Barnsley F.C. players
English Football League players
National League (English football) players
Isthmian League players
Northern Premier League players
Association football forwards